Ballari, also known as Bellary (pronounced ), is a major district in Karnataka. It is located at north-eastern part of Karnataka. This district belongs to Kalyana-Karnataka. This district was one of the biggest districts in Karnataka until the Vijayanagara district was carved out of Ballari district in 2021 officially.

This district has the highest deposits of iron ore in India.

Historical sites, farm land and rich minerals characterize Ballari district. Recently making headlines with mining industry, Ballari, the district's capital, is known as Steel City and Gani Nadu (City of Mining).

History

Earlier Ballari district was part of Madras presidency. The area was severely affected by the Great Famine of 1876–78. After Indian independence, when the Indian states were reorganized along linguistic lines, Ballari became part of the Kalyana-Karnataka region of the state of Karnataka, now renamed as Kalyana-Karnataka. In 1882, Anantapur District was formed by carving out from Ballari district and in 2021, Vijayanagara district was separated from Ballari officially.

Geography
Ballari district is spread from southwest to northeast and is situated on the eastern side of Karnataka state. The district is 15° 30’ and 15°50’ north latitude and 75° 40’ and 77° 11’ east longitude. The geographical area is 8447 km2.

This district is bounded by Raichur District  on the north, Koppal District, Vijayanagara district  on the west, Chitradurga District and Davanagere District  on the south, and Anantapur District and Kurnool District of Andhra Pradesh on the east.

The normal rainfall is 639  mm.

Assembly and Parliament constituencies
The district consists of one Lok Sabha constituency (Ballari, reserved for STs) and five Karnataka Legislative Assembly constituencies. These are

91. Kampli (ST)

92. Siruguppa (ST)

93. Ballari (ST)

94. Ballari City

95. Sandur (ST)

The Assembly constituency of Siruguppa is part of the parliamentary constituency of Koppal.

Economy
The major occupation of this district is agriculture and 75% of its total labour force is dependent on agriculture for its livelihood. The important crops grown are cotton, jowar, groundnuts, rice, sunflowers and cereals. The net irrigated area is 37% of the net area sown.

As of 1998, the main source of irrigation is Tungabhadra Dam (presently in Vijayanagara district). The canal network accounts for 64% of the district's irrigated area. Important rivers are Tungabhadra, Hagari and Chikkahagari. The western taluks of the district have been plagued by low rainfall for successive years. However, during the current and preceding years, heavy rains have created havoc in the district leaving many in the lurch.

Industries
Ballari district is rich in natural resources that need to be tapped to a great extent for the overall development of the district. This district is endowed with rich mineral resources. It has both metallic and non-metallic minerals. The metallic minerals include iron ore, manganese ore, gold, copper and lead. The non-metallic minerals include andalusite, asbestos, corundum, clay, dolomite, limestone, limekankan, molding sand, quartz, soap stone, granite and red ochre. The metallic minerals are abundant is only two talukas, Sanduru and Ballari in the order of mining activity intensity. The annual production of Iron ore is anywhere between 2.75 and 4.5 million tonnes, and manganese ore between 0.13 million tonnes to 0.30 million tonnes (1991).The real estate prices have already started to shoot as more and more industries are finding their way into this city. Ballari to its credit has the second largest single rock mountain in the world.

Mining
Ballari district has 25% of India's iron ore reserves. Till 1994 handful of mining companies operated here including state-owned NMDC.
Later Govt issued mining licenses to many private operators. Mining Industry boomed with a surge in Iron Ore prices due to demand from emerging China. Mining license allocation policy from Central govt was based on Political Nepotism rather than merit.
Flawed mining policy leads to widespread illegal mining. Since the year 2000 money from illegal money flowed into electoral politics of Karnataka State. This led to the emergence of powerful Reddy Brothers to state politics. Reddy brothers fueled money from illegal mining into politics, thereby King Makers of Karnataka State politics. Ombudsman's report on mining in Karnataka state found that the promoters of privately owned mining companies in the Ballari region paid off politicians, and then joined politics themselves, rising to positions in the Karnataka state government. These mining businessmen-turned-politicians exerted so much influence over the local officials that the Indian media began describing Ballari as a "new republic".

Despite the availability of minerals in large quantities, this district is considered to be an industrially backward district. There are 23 units of large and medium scale industries in this district with an investment of Rs.447.76 crores employing around 9,222 persons At present it occupies ninth place in the state. Sathavahana Ispat Ltd. is the first Pig Iron plant set up in the region to utilize the abundant iron ore reserves available, Kirloskar was the next to follow with their Pig Iron plant. However, with the commissioning of Jindal Vijayanagar Steel Limited at Tornagallu, the industry scenario of this district underwent sea changes. It is understood that Mukand Steels and Kalyani Steels have started industries in this area. The inflow of investment into these industries would be around Rs.30,000 Crores. The district will, therefore, come under heavy pressure on basic infrastructure such as power, communication, health, education, and police stations which again invite heavy investment to create the needed infrastructure. Urgent action is needed to pool the resources under various sectors such as District Sector, State sector, Border Area Development, HKDB etc., and prepare a perspective plan to the emerging challenges. However, the mining industry in Ballari has caused devastating environmental damage and subsequent socioeconomic crises. Therefore, courts in Karnataka have ordered the reclamation of the region.

Demographics
According to the 2011 census Ballari district has a population of 2,452,595, roughly equal to the nation of Kuwait or the US state of Nevada. This gives it a ranking of 168th in India (out of a total of 640). Its population growth rate over the decade 2001-2011 was 24.92%. Ballari has a sex ratio of 978 females for every 1000 males, and a literacy rate of 67.85%.

Tourism
Ballari Fort, a historic fort.
Bommghatta, known for its temple which hosts the deity Hanuman as Hulikunteraya.
Timmalapura, known for its temple to Sri Krishna.
Sanduru, known for its temple to Kumaraswamy.

Transport

By Air
The nearest airport is Vidyanagar Airport. The airport is connected with Bangalore and Hyderabad daily.
A new airport is under construction in the outskirts of Ballari city.

By Rail
The district has main junction at Ballari station, which falls under Hubli division.

By Road
The district has main National Highway 67 and NH 150A. The district is connected with Jewargi-Chamrajanagar Highway. KKRTC run buses in Ballari District.

Politics
 Y. Devendrappa: MP Ballari (ST)
 K. C. Kondaiah: Former MP and MLC
 B Nagendra: Ballari Rural MLA
 P.T. Paramaeshwar Naik: Former minister and current MLA, Hoovina Hadagali
 M. P. Prakash - former Deputy CM of Karnataka
 G. Janardhana Reddy: mining baron and BJP member. A former minister in the BS Yeddyurappa government, he was sentenced to 3 years in jail for Illegal iron ore mining 
 G. Karunakara Reddy: Former Minister and MLA  Harpanahalli
 G. Somashekara Reddy: MLA, Ballari City
 Anand Singh: Hospet MLA and former minister
 B. Sriramulu: BJP vice president of Karnataka and current Health minister
 E Tukram: Sandur MLA and former minister
 Allum Veerabhadrappa: MLC and Former  KPCC President

Demand for a separate district
People of Hospet, led by Forest Minister and Ballari in-charge MLA Anand Singh, demanded bifurcation of Ballari district into Vijayanagar and Ballari districts. In November 2020, the cabinet approved the division of the district into Ballari and Vijayanagara district. Ballari district consists of Ballari, Kampli, Sandur, Siruguppa and Kurugodu taluks while Vijayanagara district consists of Hospet, Harappanahalli, Huvina Hadagali, Kottur, Hagaribommanahalli and Kudligi taluks.

See also
Chilagodu
Narsapur, Karnataka
Vijayanagara district

References

External links 

 Official website
Incredible India Hampi Guide
Info on Hampi .

Districts of Karnataka
 

kn:ಬಳ್ಳಾರಿ